Thiago Maier dos Santos (born 31 August 1986 in Curitiba, Paraná), known as Schumacher, is a Brazilian footballer who plays for Operário Ferroviário.

On 31 August 2009, he was loaned to the Austrian side Austria Wien.

On 25 July 2014, he moved to Académica. After playing for the Italian club Malucelli, he was signed to Castiadas from September 2015 to January 2016 and to Linense from January to April 2016.

References

External links

Brazilian footballers
Brazilian expatriate footballers
Club Athletico Paranaense players
Ascoli Calcio 1898 F.C. players
Udinese Calcio players
Ciudad de Murcia footballers
Dijon FCO players
SK Austria Kärnten players
FK Austria Wien players
FC Volyn Lutsk players
Associação Ferroviária de Esportes players
Associação Académica de Coimbra – O.A.F. players
J. Malucelli Futebol players
Clube Atlético Linense players
Operário Ferroviário Esporte Clube players
Ukrainian Premier League players
Serie A players
Ligue 2 players
Austrian Football Bundesliga players
Primeira Liga players
Expatriate footballers in Italy
Expatriate footballers in France
Expatriate footballers in Spain
Expatriate footballers in Austria
Expatriate footballers in Ukraine
Brazilian expatriate sportspeople in Ukraine
Expatriate footballers in Portugal
Association football forwards
Footballers from Curitiba
1986 births
Living people
Brazilian expatriate sportspeople in Austria
Brazilian people of German descent